Ushoji (natively known as Ushojo) is an Indo-Aryan language spoken in Kohistan and Swat districts of the Khyber-Pakhtunkhwa province of Pakistan.

Status 
Ushoji may be incredibly endangered due to the dominance of the Pashto language in the region, especially in Swat.

Numerals

Orthography 
Ushojo is written in a variety of the Torwali and Shina alphabets in the Perso-Arabic script in the Nastaliq style.

References

Decker 1992 Ushojo

Dardic languages
Languages of Khyber Pakhtunkhwa